The 1999 Hessian state election was held on 7 February 1999 to elect the members of the Landtag of Hesse. The incumbent coalition government of the Social Democratic Party (SPD) and The Greens led by Minister-President Hans Eichel was defeated. This came despite polls indicating the government would be returned with an increased majority and that the SPD would overtake the Christian Democratic Union (CDU) as the largest party in the Landtag. After the election, the CDU and Free Democratic Party (FDP) formed a coalition, with CDU leader Roland Koch elected as Minister-President.

Parties
The table below lists parties represented in the previous Landtag of Hesse.

Opinion polling

Election result

|-
! colspan="2" | Party
! Votes
! %
! +/-
! Seats 
! +/-
! Seats %
|-
| bgcolor=| 
| align=left | Christian Democratic Union (CDU)
| align=right| 1,215,783
| align=right| 43.4
| align=right| 4.2
| align=right| 50
| align=right| 5
| align=right| 45.5
|-
| bgcolor=| 
| align=left | Social Democratic Party (SPD)
| align=right| 1,102,544
| align=right| 39.4
| align=right| 1.4
| align=right| 46
| align=right| 2
| align=right| 41.8
|-
| bgcolor=| 
| align=left | Alliance 90/The Greens (Grüne)
| align=right| 201,194
| align=right| 7.2
| align=right| 4.0
| align=right| 8
| align=right| 5
| align=right| 7.3
|-
| bgcolor=| 
| align=left | Free Democratic Party (FDP)
| align=right| 142,845
| align=right| 5.1
| align=right| 2.3
| align=right| 6
| align=right| 2
| align=right| 5.5
|-
! colspan=8|
|-
| bgcolor=|
| align=left | The Republicans (REP)
| align=right| 75,113
| align=right| 2.7
| align=right| 0.7
| align=right| 0
| align=right| ±0
| align=right| 0
|-
| bgcolor=|
| align=left | Others
| align=right| 62,892
| align=right| 2.2
| align=right| 
| align=right| 0
| align=right| ±0
| align=right| 0
|-
! align=right colspan=2| Total
! align=right| 2,800,371
! align=right| 100.0
! align=right| 
! align=right| 110
! align=right| ±0
! align=right| 
|-
! align=right colspan=2| Voter turnout
! align=right| 
! align=right| 66.4
! align=right| 0.1
! align=right| 
! align=right| 
! align=right| 
|}

Sources
 The Federal Returning Officer

1999
Hesse
Hessian state election